Yoshihiko Kowata (born 19 January 1965) is a Japanese equestrian. He competed at the 1992 Summer Olympics and the 1996 Summer Olympics.

References

1965 births
Living people
Japanese male equestrians
Olympic equestrians of Japan
Equestrians at the 1992 Summer Olympics
Equestrians at the 1996 Summer Olympics
Place of birth missing (living people)